The Adventures of Brer Rabbit is a 2006 American animated comedy film loosely inspired by the African American Br'er Rabbit stories popularized by Joel Chandler Harris. The film notably features an all-black cast, including Nick Cannon as the titular character. It was described by The Washington Post as having hip-hop influences. It was nominated for the Best Home Entertainment Production Annie Award.

Plot

A girl named Janey is constantly pushed around by her siblings, Lester and Julie. She goes for a walk in the woods, only to happen upon an anthropomorphic rabbit named Brer Rabbit being chased by a fox named Brer Fox. Brer Rabbit soon tricks Brer Fox into getting trapped down a well before scurrying off. Janey is soon approached by Brer Turtle, who begins to tell her some of Brer Rabbit’s exploits. The movie then becomes a series of vignettes starring Brer Rabbit.

How the Animals Came to Earth
Brer Turtle explains that the animals once lived as constellations in outer space, watched over by Sister Moon. When Sister Moon catches a cold, she tasks Brer Rabbit to send a message to a human on Earth named Mr. Man that she will be going away for a while to recuperate through a series of metaphors. While Brer Rabbit manages to get the message across, he was confused and didn’t tell Mr. Man exactly how she said it, prompting Sister Moon to get upset and they have a spat that culminates in Brer Rabbit making holes in her. Because of this, Brer Rabbit decides to move to Earth and when he tells the other animals how good it is, they decide to move with him.

How Brer Rabbit Tricks Brer Fox Again and what came next
Brer Rabbit spends his days trying to avoid getting eaten by the predator animals (most notably Brer Fox and Brer Wolf) and constantly outwits them through a series of comical hijinks.

Brer Rabbit Tricks Brer Bear
When Brer Rabbit tries to pick some peanuts in Brer Fox’s property, he is promptly caught in a trap and hung from a tree. He notices Brer Bear coming along and dupes him into taking his place by saying that he is “earning a dollar and hour” by guarding the peanut bushes and they manage to switch before Brer Fox comes.

Sister Moon in the Pond
The animals have an annual fishing trip at night. Brer Rabbit is having no such luck, so he and Brer Turtle work together to distract the others by making them think Sister Moon is in the pond and scaring away the fishes so that they can steal their fish for themselves.

How Brer Rabbit breaks up the Party
Brer Turtle tells Janey that Brer Rabbit’s antics eventually caused the other animals to snub him from a party at Brer Fox’s house. Brer Rabbit soon gets an idea to retaliate by covering himself in mud, leaves and sticks and pretends to be a monster to scare away the animals, putting an abrupt end to the party. Satisfied with his payback at first, Brer Rabbit then sadly walks away to sulk in loneliness.

Brer Rabbit to the Rescue
Feeling sorry for Brer Rabbit, Brer Turtle attempts to get Brer Wolf to befriend him, but Brer Wolf rebuffs him and soon tries to eat him before Brer Rabbit saves him. After which, Brer Rabbit then begins to perform selfless acts for the other animals, causing  him to be in their good graces, with the exception of Brer Fox.

How Brer Rabbit and Brer Bear Trick Brer Fox
When Brer Rabbit learns from Brer Fox that he is after some “big game” food to feed his relatives, he soon find out that he’s trying to capture Brer Bear. So the two of them manage to trick Brer Fox into catching the ferocious Brer Lion and Brer Fox is promptly beaten to a pulp. However, later that night, Brer Fox breaks down Brer Rabbit’s front door and captures him.

Brer Rabbit’s Laughing Place
Tied up to a pole to be roasted by Brer Fox, Brer Rabbit manages to convince him that creatures who eat “sad rabbits” don’t fare very well and tells Brer Fox that he can be happy if he goes to his “laughing place”. Brer Rabbit leads Brer Fox way across the forest to an old tree where he tricks Brer Fox into causing a bee-hive to fall on his head, prompting the Fox to run away, leaving Brer Rabbit tied up on the pole.

Brer Wolf Gets in Trouble
Brer Wolf finds Brer Rabbit tied to the pole but before he eats him, Brer Rabbit fools Brer Wolf into going into a log by saying that there’s buried treasure within it. Brer Rabbit pushes the log off a cliff it was hanging over and into a pond where he meets Brer Fox and they soon find out that Brer Rabbit tricked them both again.

Brer Rabbit and The Briar Patch
Brer Fox and Brer Wolf resolve to get revenge on the rabbit by making a baby out of tar. When Brer Rabbit happens upon it he gets trapped in it, and Brer Fox and Brer Wolf appear to ponder on how to get rid of Brer Rabbit. The rabbit sees a briar patch and gets an idea to use reverse psychology to make them throw him in there. They do so, and Brer Rabbit gets free and tricks them into jumping into the patch themselves.

Back in the present, Brer Fox happens upon Brer Turtle and Janey and asks where Brer Rabbit went. Brer Turtle points him in the wrong direction. After Brer Fox leaves, Brer Rabbit arrives and Janey asks how he is able to trick the other animals, to which Brer Rabbit responds “just give them what they think they want”. Janet’s mother than calls her for dinner and she says goodbye to the animals.

How Janey Tricks Lester
In the final vignette, Janey takes what Brer Rabbit said to heart and dupes Lester into wanting their mom’s dinner, which is tuna casserole, much to his dismay. Brer Rabbit and Turtle see this and are impressed before they have a race to go back to the woods. Brer Rabbit is then caught in another trap.

The movies ends by showing Sister Moon in outer space watching over the rabbit with a smile before winking at the audience.

Voice cast
Wayne Brady as Brer Wolf
Nick Cannon as Brer Rabbit
Danny Glover as Brer Turtle
D. L. Hughley as Brer Fox
Phil LaMarr as Brer Gator
Wanda Sykes as Sister Moon
Gary Anthony Williams as Brer Bear
Debra Wilson as Sister Buzzard
Monica Allison as Julie
Rhyon Nicole Brown as Janey
Dorian Harewood as Mr. Man
Dawnn Lewis as Mom
Quinton Madin as Lester
Daniel Christopher Paige as Brer Crow/Brer Lion/Brer Skunk/Brer Elephant 
Deborah Speck as Momma Mouse
Michael Ferdie as Ninja #1
Jeff Kushner as Ninja #2

See also
Song of the South, a controversial 1946 adaption by Disney.

References

External links

2006 animated films
2006 films
2006 direct-to-video films
Universal Pictures direct-to-video animated films
American children's animated comedy films
Universal Animation Studios animated films
Universal Pictures direct-to-video films
2000s musical comedy films
American folklore films and television series
Films scored by Stephen James Taylor
2000s American animated films
African-American animated films
2006 comedy films
Br'er Rabbit
2000s English-language films